Indosmodicinus is a monotypic genus of Asian crab spiders containing the single species, Indosmodicinus bengalensis. It was first described by S. Sen, S. Saha & D. Raychaudhuri in 2010, and is found in China and India.

See also
 List of Thomisidae species

References

Further reading

Monotypic Araneomorphae genera
Spiders of Asia
Thomisidae